Victor Wilson Sears (March 14, 1918 – September 22, 2006) was an American football guard and tackle who played in the National Football League (NFL) for the Philadelphia Eagles.

He played college football at Oregon State University where he was a member of Phi Sigma Kappa fraternity. Sears was drafted in the fifth round of the 1941 NFL Draft, (33rd overall), by the Pittsburgh Steelers, and was soon after traded to the Philadelphia Eagles for whom he played his first game in 1941. His consistent play as a Tackle and Defensive Tackle earned him membership into the NFL's Hall of Fame as a member of the NFL's 1940s All-Decade Team. Mid-career, at the height of World War II, Sears played as a member of the "Steagles", a team that was the result of the temporary merger between his own Philadelphia Eagles and the Pittsburgh Steelers during the league-wide manpower shortages in 1943 brought on by World War II.

Nicknamed "Old Smoothie", Sears was active as a player until 1953, accounting for 12 defense-scored points during his playing career.

References

1918 births
2006 deaths
American football guards
American football tackles
Oregon State Beavers football players
Philadelphia Eagles players
Steagles players and personnel
People from Jefferson County, Oregon
Players of American football from Oregon